The San Jacinto Ordnance Depot was a World War II facility built on an almost  site located on the Houston Ship Channel, approximately  southeast of downtown Houston, Texas. The job of the depot was to support the U.S. Army and U.S. Navy by storing and inspecting ammunition received from manufacturers that was being shipped through the Port of Houston docks, and storing and inspecting  ammunition received from domestic U.S. military bases and areas of overseas operations.

The depot also supported army and navy operations for a short while after World War II, but plans were made to gradually phase out the depot's mission. Before the depot could be shut down, the United States became involved in the Korean War, and plans to cease operations were postponed. The depot was finally determined to be unnecessary in 1959, and the United States Army Corps of Engineers was given control and responsibility of the site. The land and facilities of the depot were sold to the Houston Channel Industrial Corporation in October 1964.

References

United States Army in World War II
United States Navy in World War II
United States Army logistics installations
Buildings and structures in Harris County, Texas
Military installations in Texas
Historic American Engineering Record in Texas
United States Army arsenals during World War II
1964 disestablishments in Texas
Military installations closed in 1964